Enterprize was launched in America in 1791, possibly under another name. Between 1797 and  1799 she made two complete voyages as a slave ship. She was wrecked in 2001 at Suriname after having disembarked the slaves she had carried there on her third slave trading voyage.

Career
Enterprize first appeared in Lloyd's Register (LR) in 1797.

1st slave voyage (1797–1798): Captain Edward Jackson acquired a letter of marque on 12 December 1796. Enterprize sailed from Liverpool on 17 February 1797. She acquired her slaves at Ambriz and arrived at Demerara on 11 December with 357 slaves. She arrived back at Liverpool on 23 April 1798. She had left Liverpool with 28 crew members and she suffered one crew death on her voyage. 

Lloyd's List reported in April 1798 that Enterprize, Jackson, master, had run into a frigate while Enterprize was sailing from Demerara to Liverpool, and would have to stop in Tortola to repair.

2nd slave voyage (1798–1799): Captain John Brine acquired a letter of marque on 25 June 1798. Enterprize sailed from Liverpool on 15 August, bound for West Africa. She acquired slaves at Angola and sailed from Africa on 14 April 1799. She arrived at St Kitts on 13 May with 348 slaves. She sailed from St Kitts on 16 June, stopped in Antigua, and arrived back at Liverpool on 22 August. She had left Liverpool with 36 crew members and had suffered nine crew deaths on her voyage. 

3rd slave voyage (1786–1787): Captain Henry Booth acquired a letter of marque on 11 April 1800. Enterprize sailed from Liverpool on 6 May. She acquired her slaves at Bonny and arrived at Suriname on 15 June 1801 with 232 slaves.

Loss
Lloyd's List reported that Enterprize, from Africa, had been wrecked at Surinam. Her crew were rescued. She had run aground. Part of her cargo was brought back to Suriname.

Citations

1791 ships
Ships built in the United States
Age of Sail merchant ships of England
Liverpool slave ships
Maritime incidents in 1801